Late Spring is a 2014 South Korean romance melodrama starring Park Yong-woo, Kim Seo-hyung and Lee Yoo-young. It portrays the true beauty and the platonic love discovered between a genius sculptor and his final model. It made its world premiere at the Santa Barbara International Film Festival in January 2014.

Plot 
A genius sculptor Joon-goo (Park Yong-woo) suffers from a progressive muscular paralysis and loses the meaning of life after the Korean War. His wife (Kim Seo-hyung) who dedicates herself to her beloved husband, goes in search of a model (Lee Yoo-young) to encourage him to go back to work.

Cast 
Park Yong-woo as Joon-goo
Kim Seo-hyung as Jung-sook
Lee Yoo-young as Min-kyung
Joo Young-ho as Geun-soo
Kim Su-an as Song-yi
 Bae Soo-bin as Ray Bang

Awards and nominations

References

External links 
 
 
 

2014 films
2010s Korean-language films
2014 romantic drama films
Melodrama films
Films directed by Cho Geun-hyun
South Korean romantic drama films
2010s South Korean films